Penicillium punicae is a species of fungus in the genus Penicillium.

References

punicae